van der Lith and van Lith are surnames of Dutch origin. Notable people with the names include:

 Charlotta Elisabeth van der Lith (1700–1753), a plantation owner in Dutch Surinam
 Dries van der Lith (fl. 1990s), South African air force pilot
 Frans van Lith, (1863–1926), Dutch Jesuit priest
 Jean van Lith (fl. 1950s), French aviator of the Van Lith VI

Dutch-language surnames